Aayiram Vaasal Idhayam is a 1980 Indian Tamil-language film directed by A. Jagannathan and produced by Selvam Arts. The film stars Sudhakar, Raadhika, Roja Ramani and Vadivukkarasi. It was released on 1 January 1980.

Plot

Cast 
 Sudhakar as Senthil
 Raadhika as Neelu
 Roja Ramani as Vijaya
 Vadivukkarasi as Gandhimathi
 Major Sundarrajan
 Thengai Srinivasan
 Senthamarai
 M. N. Rajam
 C. Vasantha
 Sachu

Soundtrack 
The soundtrack was composed by Ilaiyaraaja.

Reception 
Kousigan of Kalki appreciated Roja Ramani's performance, Ilaiyaraaja's music and the cinematography.

References

External links 
 

1980 films
1980s Tamil-language films
Films directed by A. Jagannathan
Films scored by Ilaiyaraaja